The RD-864 (GRAU: 15D177) is a Soviet liquid propellant rocket engine burning UDMH and nitrogen tetroxide in a gas generator combustion cycle. It has a four combustion chambers that provide thrust vector control by gimbaling each nozzle in a single axis ±55°. It is used on the third stage of the R-36M UTTKh (GRAU: 15A18) and Dnepr. For the R-36M2 (GRAU: 15A18M), an improved version, the RD-869 (GRAU: 15D300) was developed.

History
When the Soviet military developed an improved version of the R-36M ICBM, Yangel's OKB-586 developed a new engine for the third stage, the RD-864. Developed between 1976 and 1978 it flew for the first time on October 31, 1977. With the START I and START II the some 150 R-36M and R-36M UTTKh were retired and to be destroyed by 2007. So, a civilian application was looked for and during the 1990s, Yuzhnoe Design Bureau (the R-36M designer) successfully developed the Dnepr launch vehicle. It flew for the first time on April 21, 1999 and as of June 2016 it is still operational. So, while the production of the RD-864 has long since been finished, the engine is still to this day operational.

The RD-869 was an improved version for the most powerful Soviet ICBM ever, the R-36M2 (15A18M). It had improved efficiency, restart capability and burn life over the RD-864. As of January 2016 there are still 46 operational R-36M2 (RS-20V, SS-18) and thus the RD-869 is still in service, if out of production.

Versions 
There are two versions of this engine:
 RD-864 (GRAU Index: 15D177): First developed as the third stage engine for the R-36M UTTKh (15A18) ICBM and, by extension, on the Dnepr launch vehicle.
 RD-869 (GRAU Index: 15D300): An improved version of the RD-864. It has improved efficiency, restart capability and burn life. It is used on the R-36M2 (15A18M).

See also
R-36M UTTKh - The most powerful ever Soviet ICBM for which the RD-864/869 engines were created.
Dnepr - A Ukrainian small rocket project that uses the RD-864.
Yuzhnoe Design Bureau - The RD-864/869 designer bureau.
Yuzhmash - A multi-product machine-building company that's closely related to Yuzhnoe and manufactures the RD-RD-864/869.

References

External links
 Yuzhnoye Design Bureau English-language home page

Rocket engines using hypergolic propellant
Rocket engines using the gas-generator cycle
Rocket engines of the Soviet Union
Yuzhnoye rocket engines
Yuzhmash rocket engines
Rocket engines of Ukraine